My Marlon and Brando is a 2008 Turkish drama film directed by Hüseyin Karabey.
It is based on a real life story where a Turkish women struggles to meet her lover from Iraqi Kurdistan.

Cast 
 Ayça Damgacı as Ayça
 Hama Ali Khan as Hama Ali
 Cengiz Bozkurt as Kaçakçı Azad
 Nesrin Cavadzade as Derya

References

External links 

2008 drama films
Turkish drama films